Count Honoré Joseph Antoine Ganteaume (13 April 1755 in La Ciotat – 28 July 1818 in Aubagne)  was a French Navy officer and Vice-admiral.

Ganteaume started sailing on Indiamen, before serving during the American War of Independence in the fleets of Admiral d'Estaing and Suffren. At the French Revolution, he was promoted to command the 74-gun Trente-et-un Mai, taking part in the Glorious First of June and the Croisière du Grand Hiver.

Ganteaume took part in the Expedition to Egypt, narrowly escaping death during the Battle of the Nile. There, he formed a personal relationship with General Bonaparte, who supported his promotion. He was made a Rear-Admiral and given command of a squadron to supply the Army of Egypt, but in Ganteaume's expeditions of 1801, he engaged in months of complicated manoeuvres to elude the Royal Navy and eventually failed his mission.

He supplied the French forces of the Saint-Domingue expedition. During the Trafalgar Campaign, Ganteaume was to lead his squadron to the Caribbean to reinforce Villeneuve and Missiessy, but he was blockaded by British squadrons. Ganteaume held various offices during the late First French Empire, and gave his loyalty to Louis XVIII at the Bourbon Restoration.

Career 
Ganteaume was born in La Ciotat, into a family of merchant sailors. He started sailing at the age of 14 on a merchantman commanded by his father, and by the time he reached the age of 22, Ganteaume had accomplished five campaigns in the Middle East and two in the Caribbean. He served on the Mississippi Company Indiaman Fier Rodrigue.

Service in the American War of Independence 
In 1778, with the intervention of France in the American Revolutionary War, Ganteaume enlisted in the French Royal Navy as an auxiliary officer, while Fier Rodrigue was purchased into naval service as a 54-gun ship of the line. Fier Rodrigue escorted a convoy to America, and attached to a division under Lamotte-Picquet in the fleet of Admiral d'Estaing.

In the fleet of Admiral d'Estaing, Ganteaume took part in the Capture of Grenada and in the Siege of Savannah. In 1781, he was promoted to auxiliary Frigate Lieutenant, and appointed to command the fluyt Marlborough in a convoy bound for the Indies and escorted by Suffren.

From 1781 to 1785, Ganteaume served on the frigate Surveillante He was promoted to Fireship Captain in 1784, and sub-Lieutenant in 1786.

Upon his return at the peace, Ganteaume was granted permission to return to the service of the Mississippi Company. He successively commanded the Indiamen Maréchal de Ségur, bound for Chian, and Prince de Condé and Constitution, bound for the Indies. In 1793, he was captured on an Indiaman and imprisoned by the British; released, he returned to the Navy, with the rank of Lieutenant. He served on the 74-gun Jupiter for a campaign in the Atlantic Ocean.

Service on Trente-et-un Mai 

Ganteaume was promoted to Captain in 1794, and was appointed to command the 74-gun Trente-et-un Mai. During the Atlantic campaign of May 1794, he attempted to attach to the French fleet under Villaret-Joyeuse, but only joined late in the Glorious First of June; he took part in the last throes of the battle, where he was thrice wounded.

In the winter, Geanteaume led Trente-et-un Mai in the Croisière du Grand Hiver, and notably rescued the crew of the stricken Scipion.

In 1795, Trente-et-un Mai sailed to the Mediterranean, and cruised off Catalonia; she sustained a two-hour battle against a Spanish ship of the line. On 18 April 1795, Trente-et-un Mai was renamed Républicain. She attached to the fleet under Vice-Admiral Martin, and took part in the Battle of Hyères Islands.

In late 1795, Ganteaume was appointed to command a division in an expedition to Smyrna, comprising one ship of the line, four frigates and four corvettes. He sailed to Smyrna, where he lifted the blockade on Villeneuve's squadron, and captured the frigate HMS Nemesis.

In 1796, returned to the Ocean, Ganteaume successful ran the British blockade of Brest and sailed a convoy carrying munitions into the harbour.

Service in Egypt 
Appointed Chief of staff to Rear-Admiral and Navy Minister Bruix, Ganteaume took part in the French campaign in Egypt and Syria on the flagship Orient. He took part in the Battle of the Nile, where he was wounded, and narrowly escaped death when he left the burning Orient on a boat. Orient exploded soon after.

Promoted to Rear-Admiral upon request of General Bonaparte, Ganteaume led the flotilla of small ships of the Nile River, taking part in the Siege of Jaffa, the Siege of Acre and the Battle of Abukir.

On 22 August 1799, Ganteaume departed Alexandria with the frigates Muiron and Carrère, the aviso Revanche and a tartane, ferrying General Bonaparte back to France. Bonaparte ordered the ships to sail close to the shore of Africa to elude British squadrons, and landed in Corsica, to finally arrive at Fréjus on 2 October.

After arriving in France, Bonaparte, as First Consul, appointed Ganteaume to the Council of State, in which he presided the section of the Navy.

Ganteaume's expeditions of 1801 

In 1801,  Ganteaume was appointed to command a seven-ship division in Brest, tasked with ferrying supplies and 5000 soldiers to the French Army of Egypt. After successfully crossing British-held Gibraltar, Ganteaume cruised in the Mediterranean for six months to elude the British fleet.

Ganteaume returned to Toulon to resupply and repair his ships. In the following months, he attempted three sorties, once arriving off Alexandria without landing: when he finally arrived near Egypt, actually Derna, Libya, in June 1801, the troops did not land, due to the hostility of the locals and the British naval threat.

Ganteaume eventually renounced and defiantly returned to Toulon, after capturing Elba and four British ships, including the 38-gun frigate HMS Success, and in the action of 24 June 1801, the 74-gun HMS Swiftsure, but failing his mission to supply the French armies in the Middle East.

Ganteaume's tergiversations motivated the satirical poem:

Service in Saint-Domingue and the Trafalgar Campaign 
After the Treaty of Lunéville ended the War of the Second Coalition in early 1801, Ganteaume was tasked with supporting the French forces involved in the Saint-Domingue expedition. In 1802, Ganteaume was appointed Maritime Prefect for Toulon.

At the outbreak of the War of the Third Coalition the year after, and with the Coronation of Napoleon I and the advent of the First French Empire on 2 December 1804, Ganteaume was promoted to Vice-Admiral, made a Count of the Empire, and appointed to command the fleet in Brest.

In 1805, after the death of Vice-Admiral Latouche-Tréville and the outbreak of the Trafalgar Campaign, Napoléon briefly considered entrusting Ganteaume with an expedition to land an 18 000-man army in Ireland, in a move similar to what had been attempted in 1796 with the ill-fated Expédition d'Irlande; eventually, Ganteaume was ordered to the Caribbean to land reinforcements there and return to Europe with the fleets under Rear-Admiral Missiessy and Vice-Admiral Villeneuve.

Adverse weather prevented Ganteaume from leaving Brest, and he finally departed one month after Missiessy. In transit, Ganteaume bumped into the British Channel Fleet under Admiral Cornwallis and retreated to Brest, where he ended up hermetically blocked. Informed of the Battle of Cape Finisterre, Ganteaume was ordered to break into the Ocean by force to make his junction with Villeneuve; however, Villeneuve's port call to Cadiz thwarted this plan.

Later career 
In 1808, Ganteaume took command of the French squadrons of Toulon and Rochefort, joined together at Toulon, with the aim to 
ferry supplies to Corfu, then blockaded by the Royal Navy.  He departed Toulon in early February, successfully escorted his convoy into Corfu harbour, and returned to Toulon in April. In February on the following year, he authorised the frigates Pénélope and Pauline  to chase HMS Proserpine, yielding the action of 27 February 1809 in which Proserpine was captured and brought to Toulon.

In June 1808, Ganteaume was appointed General Inspector of the Coasts of the Ocean. From 1809 to 1810, Ganteaume was appointed to command the fleet in Toulon, but attacks of gout kept him increasingly away from the sea. In 1810, he joined the Council of the Admiralty. On 1 August 1811, Napoléon appointed Ganteaume to command the battalion of the Marins de la Garde in the Imperial Guard as a colonel. In 1813, he defended Toulon.

In 1814, at the first Bourbon Restoration, Ganteaume supported the Acte de déchéance de l'Empereur, and in consequence did not return to command during the Hundred Days; immediately after the Battle of Waterloo, he ordered the Royalist white flag hoisted in Toulon; this act got him almost killed.

Restored to power again, Louis XVIII made Ganteaume a Peer of France in recognition for his support. In December 1815, he was promoted to Commander in the Order of Saint Louis, and appointed General Inspector of the Classes. In his capacity of Peer of France, Ganteaume took part in the trial of Marshal Ney, and voted for his execution.

Ganteaume died at his property of Pauline, near Aubagne, on 28 September 1818. The Boulevard Amiral Ganteaume in Aubagne is named after him. 
In 1801, the explorer Nicholas Baudin named Gantheaume Point, near Broome in Western Australia, after him.

Notes and references

Notes

References

Bibliography

External links 
 

1755 births
1818 deaths
French Navy admirals
French naval commanders of the Napoleonic Wars
Grand Croix of the Légion d'honneur
Members of the Chamber of Peers of the Bourbon Restoration
People of the Haitian Revolution
French military personnel of the American Revolutionary War
Names inscribed under the Arc de Triomphe